Alamgir Sheriyar (born 15 November 1973) is a former English first-class cricketer. His last professional club was Leicestershire.

Sheriyar has had an impressive career taking over 600 wickets with his fast medium seam bowling. His career was spent mainly at Kent and Worcestershire but in 2006 Sheriyar returned to Grace Road, where he started his career.

References

1973 births
Living people
English cricketers
Worcestershire cricketers
Kent cricketers
Leicestershire cricketers
Cricketers from Birmingham, West Midlands
English people of Pakistani descent
British Asian cricketers
British sportspeople of Pakistani descent
Test and County Cricket Board XI cricketers
First-Class Counties Select XI cricketers
English cricketers of 1969 to 2000
English cricketers of the 21st century